Agbeko is a surname. Notable people with the surname include:

Joseph Agbeko (born 1980), Ghanaian boxer
Shepherd Agbeko (born 1985), Ghanaian sprinter

Ghanaian surnames